The 1948 Princeton Tigers football team was an American football team that represented Princeton University as an independent during the 1948 college football season. In its fourth season under head coach Charlie Caldwell, the team compiled a 4–4 record and outscored opponents by a total of 184 to 156. Princeton played its 1948 home games at Palmer Stadium in Princeton, New Jersey.

Schedule

References

Princeton
Princeton Tigers football seasons
Princeton Tigers football